Aleh Fyodaravich Chakunkov (Belarusian: Алег Фёдаравіч Чакункоў; Russian: Олег Фёдорович Чекунков), is a Belarusian diplomat who had served as an ambassador to Vietnam from 1998 to 2001.

Biography

On 14 July 1994, he was appointed the trade representative of the Belarus in Vietnam.

On 14 July 1997, Chakunkov was appointed Deputy Minister of Foreign Economic Relations of the Belarus.

On 4 February 1998, Chakunkov was appointed Ambassador of Belarus to Vietnam.

On 6 October 1999, he became an additional ambassador to Laos and Thailand on a part-time basis.

He was dismissed from all these positions on 14 September 2001.

Family

He has a son, Aleksey, who is the Minister for the Development of the Russian Far East and Arctic.

References

Living people
Year of birth missing (living people)
Ambassadors of Belarus